Xenorhabdus miraniensis  is a bacterium from the genus of Xenorhabdus which has been isolated from a Steinernema species from Mirani in Australia. Xenorhabdus miraniensis produces the antibiotics xenocoumacin and xenorhabdin.

References

Further reading

External links
Type strain of Xenorhabdus miraniensis at BacDive -  the Bacterial Diversity Metadatabase

Bacteria described in 2006